The Women's LEN Super Cup is an annual water polo match organized by the LEN and contested by the reigning champions of the two European club competitions, the Euro League and the LEN Trophy.

Title holders
 2006:  Honvéd
 2007:  Fiorentina
 2008:  Orizzonte Catania
 2009:  Vouliagmeni
 2010:  Vouliagmeni
 2011:  Pro Recco
 2012:  Imperia
 2013:  Sabadell
 2014:  Sabadell
 2015:  Olympiacos Piraeus
 2016:  Sabadell
 2017:  Kinef Kirishi
 2018:  Dunaújváros
 2019:  Orizzonte Catania
 2020: Cancelled due to COVID-19 pandemic
 2021:  Olympiacos Piraeus
 2022:  Olympiacos Piraeus

Finals

Source: LEN (from 2006 to 2016).

Titles by club

Titles by nation

See also
 LEN Euro League Women
 Women's LEN Trophy

References

External links
 Official LEN website

 
Recurring sporting events established in 2006
LEN club water polo competitions
Women's water polo competitions